"Escape Clause" is episode six of the American television anthology series The Twilight Zone. It is "the story of a strange contract between a mortal man and his most satanic majesty"; it originally aired on November 6, 1959, on CBS.

Opening narration

Plot
Walter Bedeker, a paranoid hypochondriac, is convinced his wife Ethel and his doctor (who insists Bedeker is in good health) are conspiring to kill him by purposely making him sick. After they leave, a rotund man named Cadwallader appears in Bedeker's room, offering him immortality and a near-total halt to his physical aging in exchange for his soul. Cadwallader inserts an escape clause allowing Bedeker to summon him at any time if he chooses to die. After Cadwallader leaves, he tests his new power by placing his hands on a hot radiator and finding them uninjured, then throws all his medicines out a window, to Ethel's surprise.

Bedeker uses his newfound invulnerability to collect insurance money and cheap thrills by hurling himself into life-threatening accidents. After doing so 14 times, he concludes that the absence of risk and fear has made his life a dreadful bore. He purposely mixes a concoction of poisonous household liquids and drinks it, shocking Ethel, but it has no effect on him at all. Bedeker explains his situation to Ethel, telling her that if she had any imagination, she would find some way for him to experience some excitement. He says he is going to jump off the roof of their apartment building; Ethel tries to stop him, but falls off the edge herself.

Bedeker calmly calls the police and tells them he killed Ethel, then allows himself to be arrested and brought to trial in hopes of experiencing the electric chair. However, due to his lawyer's defense strategy, he is instead sentenced to life in prison without parole. Cadwallader visits Bedeker in his holding cell to remind him of the escape clause. Realizing he will face eternity in prison if he does not use it, Bedeker nods and immediately suffers a fatal heart attack. The guard discovers his lifeless body and sighs, "Poor devil..."

Closing narration

Preview for next week's story

Production
"Escape Clause" was one of the three episodes-in-production mentioned by Rod Serling in his 1959 promotional film pitching the series to potential sponsors, the others being "The Lonely" and "Mr. Denton on Doomsday" (referred to as "Death, Destry, and Mr. Dingle").

Impact
"Here was a little gem.  Good work, Rod Serling.  This little piece about a hypochondriac who gets tangled up with an obese, clerical devil ranked with the best that has ever been accomplished in half-hour filmed television." —Excerpt from the Daily Variety review.

Disney's Twilight Zone Tower of Terror has a reference to this episode located in the basement of the attraction. The elevators have a certificate of inspection plaque, signed by "Cadwallader", bearing the inspection number "10259". These numbers represent October 2, 1959, the date The Twilight Zone first aired.

Further reading
Zicree, Marc Scott: The Twilight Zone Companion.  Sillman-James Press, 1982 (second edition)
DeVoe, Bill. (2008). Trivia from The Twilight Zone. Albany, GA: Bear Manor Media. 
Grams, Martin. (2008). The Twilight Zone: Unlocking the Door to a Television Classic. Churchville, MD: OTR Publishing.

References

External links
 

1959 American television episodes
The Twilight Zone (1959 TV series season 1) episodes
Hypochondriasis in fiction
Fiction about the Devil
Television episodes written by Rod Serling
Television episodes about immortality
Television episodes about death